Philip Craig may refer to:

Philip R. Craig (1923–2007), American mystery writer

See also
Craig (surname)
James Philip Craig (born 1943), Scottish footballer also known as Jim Craig
Paul Philip Craig (born 1951), English legal scholar and academic
Philip Craig Russell (born 1951), American comic book writer, artist and illustrator